Indira Gandhi Super Thermal Power Project is located between Khanpur Khurd (to south of the plant) and Jharli village (to the north of the plant) in Jhajjar district of Haryana.

History
Aravali Power Company Private Limited (APCPL) is a joint venture company with 50% share of NTPC Ltd, 25% of Haryana Power Generation Company Ltd (HPGCL, Haryana State company), and 25% of Indraprastha Power Generation Company Ltd (IPGCL, Delhi State company). The company was registered on 21st Dec 2006 as private limited of Central Government of India ,Government of Delhi and Haryana. APCPL has constructed a coal based power plant near Village Jharli, District- Jhajjar (Haryana) named Indira Gandhi Super Thermal Power Project (IGSTPP). Presently under Stage-I, power plant of 3x 500MW capacity is constructed, whose all 3 units are commissioned. It is the largest thermal power plant located in Haryana.

Capacity

www.apcpl.co.in

References 

Coal-fired power stations in Haryana
Jhajjar district
2010 establishments in Haryana
Energy infrastructure completed in 2010